The Serbian Cup (Serbian: Куп Србије, Kup Srbije) is the national football cup of Serbia. The winner of the competition gets a spot in the UEFA Europa League qualifying round.

From 2006 to 2010, the competition was known as the Lav Cup for sponsorship reasons.

History
Serbia's cup tournament is the legal successor to the Serbia and Montenegro Cup and in turn of the Yugoslav Cup. This cup tournament lasted for four seasons up until the dissolution of the state union of Serbia and Montenegro in 2006. The tournament was dominated by Serbian clubs with no Montenegrin sides reaching the final. Belgrade giants Red Star were easily the most successful club reaching the final all four years winning twice and losing in the final the other two seasons. Surprisingly, Red Star's cross-town rival Partizan did not appear in a single final.

After Montenegro left the state union with Serbia in 2006 both football associations got to work on organizing a new tournament.

Trophy
Before the tournament even began it was decided that Serbia's cup would have a new trophy and that the old one which was won by Red Star the year before would remain in its museum. However the association decided that the championship trophy would remain the same. To find a new trophy for the cup they decided to make a contest at Belgrade's Art College where students would each make one and then a trophy would be selected. The Serbian Football Association officials presented the new trophy of the National Cup competition on Monday December 11, 2006. Artist Mihajlo Mlinar defeated 50 other students in the contest held at Belgrade's Art College. The trophy which is heavily inspired by Eastern Orthodox Christianity as well as Serbian history was proclaimed as the perfect trophy for the biggest football competition in Serbia.

When the press asked Mlinar which club has his support, the 25-year-old answered that he simply never had a day of football training and that his only favorite is Serbia. Everybody present agreed that the student was the perfect candidate for making the trophy, and that he fully deserved the cash prize of 250,000 Serbian Dinars. Mlinar immediately became one of the most recognized faces across Belgrade. On May 15, 2007 at Partizan's stadium Red Star defeated Vojvodina to be the first ever Serbian Cup winner and the first team to lift the trophy that Mlinar created.

Sponsorship
In 2006, Serbian FA agreed the marketing rights with Carlsberg Srbija, previously known as Pivara Čelarevo, and the competition was named after its main brand Lav pivo. The Carlsberg affiliate signed a deal to support the Serbian Cup for four years. The company will take out a sum of €1,000,000 which will be divided in four for every year of competition. That means that the awards annual budget is going to be €250,000. Along with the rewards from endorsements the winner of the Serbian Cup gets a spot in the UEFA Europa League if they are not already qualified through Serbian SuperLiga.

Cup winners
Note: The Serbian Cup has been derived from two defunct cup tournaments the first being the Yugoslav Cup and the other being the Serbia and Montenegro Cup. The 2006–07 season was the first one that Serbia has ever held as an independent football association. For a list of previous Serbian cup winners during those tournaments visit their respective pages.

Key

Result

{| class="wikitable" style="text-align: center;"
|- style="background:#efefef;"
!width=5%|Season
!width=20%|Winner
!width=10%|Score
!width=20%|Runner-up
!width=15%|Location
!width=20%|Venue
!width=10%|Attendance
|-
|2006–07
|row style="background-color:#fff4a7"|Red Star 
|2–0|Vojvodina
|Belgrade
|Partizan Stadium
|25,000
|-
|2007–08
|row style="background-color:#fff4a7"|Partizan 
|3–0
|Zemun
|Belgrade
|Partizan Stadium
|13,950
|-
|2008–09
|row style="background-color:#fff4a7"|Partizan 
|3–0|align=center style="background-color:#9FC"|Sevojno
|Belgrade
|Partizan Stadium
|13,434
|-
|2009–10
|Red Star
|3–0|Vojvodina
|Belgrade
|Partizan Stadium
|23,000
|-
|2010–11
|row style="background-color:#fff4a7"|Partizan 
|3–01
|Vojvodina
|Belgrade
|Red Star Stadium
|25,000
|-
|2011–12
|Red Star
|2–0
|Borac Čačak
|Kruševac
|Mladost Stadium
|11,000
|-
|2012–13
|Jagodina
|1–0
|Vojvodina
|Belgrade
|Partizan Stadium
|15,000
|-
|2013–14
|Vojvodina
|2–0
|Jagodina
|Belgrade
|Partizan Stadium
|8,000
|-
|2014–15
|Čukarički
|1–0
|Partizan
|Belgrade
|Rajko Mitić Stadium
|10,000
|-
|2015–16
|Partizan
|2–0
|Javor Ivanjica
|Gornji Milanovac
|Metalac Stadium
|4,500
|-
|2016–17
|row style="background-color:#fff4a7"|Partizan 
|1–0 
|Red Star
|Belgrade
|Partizan Stadium
|20,000
|-
|2017–18
|Partizan
|2–1|Mladost Lučani
|Surdulica
|Surdulica City Stadium
|3,500
|-
|2018–19
|Partizan
|1–0|Red Star
|Belgrade
|Rajko Mitić Stadium
|20,000
|-
|2019–20
|Vojvodina
|2–2 (4–2 pen.)|Partizan
|Niš
|Čair Stadium
|5,000
|-
|2020–21
|row style="background-color:#fff4a7"|Red Star 
|0–0 (4–3 pen.)
|Partizan
|Belgrade
|Rajko Mitić Stadium
| 0
|-
|2021–22
|row style="background-color:#fff4a7"|Red Star 
|2–1|Partizan
|Belgrade
|Rajko Mitić Stadium
| 30,000
|}
1 The match was abandoned in the 83rd minute with Partizan leading 2–1 when Vojvodina walked off to protest the quality of the officiating. Originally, this was declared the final score and the Cup was awarded to Partizan, but on May 16th, 2011, after further investigation from Serbian FA concerning the match, the result was officially registered as a 3–0 win to Partizan.

Performance by club

Semi-finalsBold''' indicates finalist team in season.

Serbian all-time Cup winners (1914–)

See also
 Serbian SuperLiga
 List of football clubs in Serbia
 Serbia national football team
 Serbian Olympic Cup
 Yugoslav Cup
 Serbia and Montenegro Cup

References

External links
 Official page 
 Yugoslavia/Serbia and Montenegro - Cup Finals, RSSSF.com

 
Serbia
1
Recurring sporting events established in 2006
2006 establishments in Serbia